Camp Richardson is an unincorporated community at Lake Tahoe, in El Dorado County, California. It lies at an elevation of 6250 feet (1905 m) in the Sierra Nevada.

A post office operated at Camp Richardson from 1927 to 1973, with a closure from 1964 to 1965. The place is named after its first postmaster, Alonzo L. Richardson. A USGS topographic map from 1891 shows Camp Richardson used to be called Yanks.

References

Lake Tahoe
Unincorporated communities in El Dorado County, California
Unincorporated communities in California